Cılfır (also, Dzhilfir and Dzhylfyr) is a village in the Qubadli Rayon of Azerbaijan.
Cılfır is the Azeri village in Qubadli

References 

Populated places in Qubadli District